{{DISPLAYTITLE:C14H10O5}}
The molecular formula C14H10O5 (molar mass: 258.23 g/mol, exact mass: 258.0528 u) may refer to:

 Alternariol
 Salsalate

Molecular formulas